The Ukraine women's national football team represents Ukraine in international women's football. The team is administered by the Ukrainian Association of Football.

The team has been playing since 30 June 1992 when it hosted a team of Moldova. Before its first official tournament, the UEFA Women's Euro 1995 qualifying phase, the Ukraine women's team played at least four more friendlies all with Belarus in 1993.

The first (and so far only) major tournament they played in was the UEFA Women's Euro 2009 in Finland. Their most recent competition is qualification for the UEFA Women's Euro 2022.

Team image

Nicknames
The Ukraine women's national football team has been known or nicknamed as the "Zhinky".

Home stadium
The Ukraine women's national football team hosts their home matches at Arena Lviv, while before the Russian aggression at Stadion imeni Gagarina.
 record since 2007

Results and fixturesThe following is a list of match results in the last 12 months, as well as any future matches that have been scheduled.Legend

2022

2023

Ukraine Results and Fixtures – Soccerway.com
Ukraine Results and Fixtures – FIFA.com

Coaching staff
Current coaching staffAs of 31 March 2021Manager history

Players

Current squadThe following players were named for the 2022 Turkish Women's Cup.Caps and goals accurate up to and including 9 April 2021. 

 

 

Recent call ups
The following players have been called up to a Ukraine squad in the past 12 months.

Previous squads
UEFA European Women's Championship
2009 UEFA Women's Euro squad

Records

 Active players in bold, statistics correct as of 2020.

 Most capped players 

 Top goalscorers 

Honours

Other tournaments
 Albena Cup
  Champions: 2000
 Turkish Women's Cup
  Champions: 2022

Competitive record
FIFA Women's World Cup*Draws include knockout matches decided on penalty kicks.Qualification record

UEFA Women's Championship*Draws include knockout matches decided on penalty kicks.''

Qualification record

Minor tournaments

See also
Sport in Ukraine
Football in Ukraine
Women's football in Ukraine
Ukraine women's national under-19 football team
Ukraine women's national under-17 football team
Ukraine men's national football team

References

External links
 Official website
 Ukraine women's national football team – official website at UAF.ua 
 #МиЗбірна: in search of history of 1993–2005 (#МиЗбірна: в пошуках історії 1993–2005 років). Womensfootball.com.ua. 14 February 2020
Games by womensfootball: 2018, 2019. 
 Official website
 FIFA profile

 
Women's national team
European women's national association football teams